Estavar station (French: Gare d'Estavar) is a railway station located in the commune of Saillagouse and close to Estavar, in the department of Pyrénées-Orientales, southern France. The station is owned and operated by SNCF and served by TER Occitanie line 32 (Latour-de-Carol-Enveitg–Villefranche-Vernet-les-Bains, Train Jaune).

The station is located at kilometric point 42.463 of the Ligne de Cerdagne, colloquially known as the Little Yellow Train.

References

Railway stations in Pyrénées-Orientales